Cyril Jones may refer to:

 Cyril Lloyd Jones (1881–1981), English railway engineer
 Cyril Jones (footballer) (1920–1995), Welsh footballer